Ivan Ivanovich Ivanov (11 August 1862 – 17 December 1939) was a Russian-Soviet mathematician who worked in the field of number theory. Together with Georgy Voronoy he continued Pafnuty Chebyshev's work on the subject.

Life and work

Ivanov was born in Saint Petersburg, Russia. He finished his studies in mathematics at Saint Petersburg University with his candidate thesis, "About prime numbers". In 1891 there followed his master thesis "integral complex numbers", and in 1901 his doctoral thesis, "About some questions in connection with the number of prime numbers".

Starting in 1891, Ivanov lectured at St. Petersburg University; from 1896, he lectured at the women's university, and after 1902 at Saint Petersburg Polytechnical University.

In 1924 Ivanov was elected corresponding member of the Russian Academy of Sciences.

References

External links
 Иванов, Иван Иванович - dic.academic.ru

1862 births
1939 deaths
Mathematicians from the Russian Empire
Soviet mathematicians
19th-century mathematicians from the Russian Empire
20th-century Russian mathematicians
Number theorists
Mathematicians from Saint Petersburg
Saint Petersburg State University alumni
Burials at Bogoslovskoe Cemetery